Crenicichla saxatilis, the ring tailed pike cichlid, is a species of cichlid native to South America. It is found swimming in the Atlantic coast drainages of Suriname, French Guiana, Guyana, Venezuela and Trinidad.

References

Kullander, S.O. and H. Nijssen, 1989. The cichlids of Surinam: Teleostei, Labroidei. E.J. Brill, Leiden, The Netherlands. 256 p.

saxatilis
Fish of Suriname
Fish of French Guiana
Fish of Guyana
Fish of Venezuela
Fish of Trinidad and Tobago
Taxa named by Carl Linnaeus
Fish described in 1758